Søvasskjølen Church is a chapel of the Church of Norway in Orkland municipality in Trøndelag county, Norway. It is an annex chapel for the Orkdal parish which is part of the Orkdal prosti (deanery) in the Diocese of Nidaros. The small church was built in 1981 in a long church style to be a mountain sports chapel. The church looks like a holiday cottage and it seats about 130 people.

History
The mountain sports chapel was built in 1981 and it was consecrated on 23 August 1981. The church has an altarpiece made by Kalla Skrøvseth. The church is owned and run by a foundation.

See also
List of churches in Nidaros

References

Orkland
Churches in Trøndelag
Long churches in Norway
Wooden churches in Norway
20th-century Church of Norway church buildings
Churches completed in 1981
1981 establishments in Norway